Darshan Singh Sur is a North Indian classical violinist whose roots are in the Senia Gharana.
Darshan has done several captivating solos in almost every major city of India and abroad. He has mastered the art of jugalbandi with various instruments like guitar, sitar, flute, sarangi, and Hawaiian guitar.

His primary quality is to maintain the structure of a raga while elaborating it with absolute imagination. His sense of aesthetics can be witnessed when he share stages with many renowned musicians and bands like Jalebee Cartel, Mrigya, Samved, world-famous piano player Brian Salas, Advaita, Shibani Kashyap, Valentine, Mame Khan, Shipley Bobby Cash, Slovenian guitar player Igor Bezget, and Leslie Luis. He also made significant innovations while playing with the world-famous Odissi-dancer Ranjana Gauhar (Padma Shree). He has performed in Direct Dil Se Music Festival, The Gig week, Balure Festival, The Big Gig, Rock for Child Rights Festival, Delhi International Art Festival, IIT Delhi Rendezvous Festival, The Wild Festival, Jaipur Literature Festival 2014, and City of M Festival, Hyderabad. He has also shared the stage with big bands like Indian Ocean and Agnee, and has collaborated with Times Music, too.

He has given several interviews and bytes to HIT 95FM, NDTV, FM Rainbow, HT City New Delhi, Mail Today, and HT City Dehradun.

Presently, Darshan is associated with Barefaced Liar, an English rock band, since 2012. He performs mainly in venues like Bacardi, NH7 Weekender, Hard Rock, Blue FROG, Kamani Auditorium, Siri Fort Auditorium, Habitat Centre, Epi Center, IIC, Lakshmipat Singhania Auditorium, Raagabonds, and Nexus. His famous projects are D-Major Symphony and Trizya, which are gaining popularity as a music ensemble.

PERFORMANCE DETAILS
Off-Stage Members
0
Performance Duration
90 - 120 Minutes
Open To Travel
Nationwide
Location
New Delhi, Delhi
Events Preferred

Languages

TAGS: Instrumentalist in Delhi Ncr | Wedding Instrumentalist in Delhi NCR
Didn't find what you were looking for?

India's Largest Marketplace for Professional Artists

StarClinch
On social networks 
   
REGISTERED OFFICE ADDRESS:
VINSM Globe Private Limited
Percept House, Ground Floor
East of Kailash, New Delhi
CIN: U52605DL2012PTC236944

Contact Us
FOR BUYERS
Our Buyers
Browse
Post Your Requirement
Entertainment on EMI

FOR ARTISTS
Login
Artist SignUp
Artist Member
Jobs
ABOUT US
Our Story
Careers

POLICY
Privacy Policy
Terms of Use
Disclaimer
FAQs
© Copyright 2015-19 | VINSM Globe Pvt. Ltd. | All Rights Reserved.

Early life and training 
Darshan learnt violin first from Joi Srivastava and later on from his grandson Sharat Chandra Srivastava.

Career 
Apart from North Indian classical performances, Darshan has performed with various Indian bands like Mrigya, Advaita, Jalebee Cartel, Saamved. Since 2012 he has performed with the Indian rock band Barefaced Liar. He was the founder of the Indian band Trizya and is currently leading the D-Major Symphony Project.

References 

Hindustani instrumentalists
Hindustani violinists
Indian violinists
Year of birth missing (living people)
Living people
21st-century violinists